James Ewen Murray (born 7 October 1954) is a retired Scottish professional golfer who played on the European Tour. He is now better known as a commentator for Sky Sports Golf channel.

He turned professional in 1971 after considerable success as a boy golfer. As a 15-year-old, Murray had reached the final of the 1970 Boys Amateur Championship and the following year won the World Junior Championship, the Scottish Boys Championship and the Scottish Boys Stroke Play Championship.

Murray won the 1977 Northern Open at Royal Dornoch, five ahead of the field. His best performances on the European Tour were two third places; in the 1979 SOS Talisman TPC and in the 1981 Bob Hope British Classic. He played regularly in Africa on the Safari Circuit, winning the Zambia Open in 1980 and the Nigerian Open in 1984, when he also topped the Order of Merit.

Amateur wins
1971 World Junior Championship, Scottish Boys Championship, Scottish Boys Stroke Play Championship

Professional wins (3)

Safari Circuit wins (2)

Other wins (2)
1977 Northern Open

Results in major championships

Note: Murray only played in The Open Championship.

CUT = missed the half-way cut (3rd round cut in 1979 Open Championship)
"T" indicates a tie for a place

References

External links

Scottish male golfers
Golfers from Edinburgh
Golf writers and broadcasters
Sports commentators
1954 births
Living people